Glover, which means a maker or seller of gloves, is an English surname. Notable people with the surname include:

Ablade Glover (born 1934), Ghanaian artist
Albert Glover (1849–1941), New Zealand politician
Alfred Glover (1872–1949), English cricketer
Allan Glover (born 1950), English (soccer) footballer
Allan C. Glover (1900–1984), South Australian artist
Ann Glover, or Annie Glover, Irish washerwoman, the last woman hanged as a witch in Boston
Anne Glover (disambiguation), multiple people
Anne Glover (biologist) (born 1956), Scottish biologist
Anne Glover (venture capitalist) (born 1954)
Bill Glover (born 1952), American drummer and musician
Bob Glover, American running coach and author
Boyer Glover (fl. 1758–1771), English watch and clock maker
Brian Glover (1934–1997), British actor
Broc Glover (born 1960), American motocross racer
Bruce Glover (born 1932), American actor
Candice Glover (born 1989), winner of season 12 of American Idol
Cat Glover, choreographer and dancer
Charles Glover Barkla (1877–1944), British physicist
Charles Carroll Glover (1846–1936), American banker and philanthropist
Charles Richmond Glover (1870–1936), Australian mayor
Corey Glover (born 1964), American singer, vocalist of Living Colour
Crispin Glover (born 1964), American actor and painter
Crispin J. Glover, British DJ
Dana Karl Glover (born 1958), musician and composer
Dana Glover (singer) (born 1974), singer and songwriter
Danny Glover (born 1946), American actor
Danny Glover (footballer) (born 1989), English footballer
David Glover (born 1948), British geneticist
David Delano Glover (1868–1952), American politician
Dean Glover (born 1963), English football manager and former player
Denis Glover (1912–1980), New Zealand poet
Dion Glover (born 1978), American basketball player
Donald Glover (born 1983), American actor, comedian, and rapper
Edward Glover (athlete) (1885–1940), American athlete
Edward Glover (psychoanalyst) (1888–1972), English psychoanalyst
Fi Glover (born 1970), BBC journalist
Frank Glover (born 1949), American jazz musician
Fred W. Glover (born 1937), mathematician
Gary Glover (born 1976), baseball player
George Glover (disambiguation), multiple people
Gordon Glover (1908–1975), British writer
Harry Glover (artist) (c. 1810–1858), English lithographer in South Australia
Helen Glover (rower) (born 1986), Olympic gold medal rower
Henry Glover (1921–1991), American songwriter, arranger, record producer and trumpeter
Henry H. Glover (1827–1904), Australian artist and lithographer, son of Harry
James Glover (British Army officer) (1929–2000)
James Glover (disambiguation), multiple people
Jane Glover (born 1949), British conductor
Jean Glover (1758–1801), Scottish poet, actress and singer
Jim Glover (born 1942), American folk musician
Jimmy Glover (1861–1931), Irish composer and conductor
John Glover (disambiguation), multiple people
John William Glover (1815–1899), Irish composer
Jonathan Glover (born 1941), British philosopher
Jose Glover (died 1638), English minister and pioneer of printing in the New World
Joseph Glover, American professor, Provost for the University of Florida
Joshua Glover, runaway slave tested Fugitive Slave Law in Wisconsin
Juleanna Glover, former White House press secretary
Julian Glover (born 1935), British actor
Kim Glover, British music manager 
La'Roi Glover (born 1974), American football player
Lee Glover (born 1970), British footballer
Louise Glover (born 1983), British model
Lucas Glover (born 1979), American professional golfer
Mae Glover (1906–1985), American blues singer
Martin Glover (born 1960), record producer
Mary Glover, first married name of Mary Baker Eddy
Melvin Glover (born 1961), hip hop artist Melle Mel
Moses Glover, English cartographer
Nat Glover (born 1943), American sheriff
Nate Glover, the singer Kid Creole (rapper)
Neville Glover (born 1955), Australian rugby league footballer
Paul Glover (activist) (born 1947), American politician
Richard Glover (disambiguation), multiple people
Robert Glover (disambiguation), multiple people
Robert W. Glover (1866–1956), American clergyman and politician
Roger Glover (born 1945), Welsh bass player and songwriter with Deep Purple
Sandra Glover (born 1968), African-American athlete
Savion Glover (born 1973), American actor, tap dancer and choreographer
Stephen Glover (disambiguation), several people named "Steven", "Stephen", "Steve"
Stephen Glover (antiquary) (1794–1870), English author and historian
Stephen Gilchrist Glover (born 1974), TV performer 'Steve-O'
Sybil Mullen Glover (1908–1995), British artist
Thomas Glover (disambiguation), multiple people
Terrot R. Glover (1869–1943), British Classical Studies scholar
Townend Glover (1813–1883), American entomologist
Valerie Glover, Australian artist
Victor J. Glover, American astronaut

English-language surnames
Scottish surnames
Occupational surnames
English-language occupational surnames